José María Albiñana (October 13, 1883 – 1936) was a Spanish physician, neurologist, medical writer, philosopher and anti-republican right-wing politician.

Born in Enguera, Valencia, he was a Doctor of Medicine specialising in mental health. He was also a doctor in law and philosophy and with Delgado Barreto founded the Partido Nacionalista Español.

Medicine 
He was an academic of the Real Academia Nacional de Medicina of Spain where he was awarded for his work in medical philosophy Concepto actual de la Filosofía médica y su valor en el desarrollo de la Medicina.

He founded the newspaper La Sanidad Civil in order to vindicate the rights of medical professionals, and was funded by the state. In 1920 he was elected to the chair of History of Medicine at the University of Alcala but without success and later distanced himself from university life. From his early 20s he began publishing medical literature and philosophy. His notable works of his first 20 years in the profession are shown below in his published works.

Mexico 

In the 1920s he continued his activity in Mexico, in the Mexican capital, where he established his own clinic. He became acquainted with the Hispanic-American way of life and attended many conferences, publishing a multitude of new works and three autobiographical novels: Sol de Levante (Gerardo Sisniega, México, 1923), Aventuras Tropicales. En busca del oro verde (Madrid, 1928) and Bajo el cielo mejicano (Cía. Ibero-Americana de Publicaciones Madrid, 1930).

His time in Mexico was marred by political unrest and violence. Madero had been assassinated in 1913, Emiliano Zapata in 1919, Pancho Villa in 1923 and Carranza in 1920. Farmer revolts, coup d'etats and crime became the political norm. Obregón was assassinated in 1928 and the Cristero War broke out with the cristeros representing the aspiration of the Mexican Catholics. Such was the mistrust of foreigners during this period, that Albinana was later expelled from the country under Plutarco Elías Calles

Burgos delegate
Albiñana returned to Spain in Burgos where he was later elected as its delegate in 1934, and reelected in 1936, although by this time his Valencian accent had become mixed with a Mexican accent causing some suspicion. Over time he gained the trust of the people in Burgos, catering to the needs of the neighbourhoods and readily answering questions. He brought about a number of infrastructural developments in Burgos including the legal work for the Compañía de Aguas de Burgos (Burgos Water Company), installation of the telephone in Villarcayo and Medina de Pomar, and the installation and creation of Burgos Airport, securing important subsidies and investors to develop the region.

Assassination and tribute
He was murdered along with other prominent politicians by militia men when they took over the Carcel Modelo. With the triumph of the Nationalist faction, streets in several localities, mainly in his native Valencia, were dedicated to him.

Published works
La medicina en verso. Colección de humoradas médico-literarias, (1904)
Fraternidad y cultura. Medios que pueden ponerse en práctica por el Estado, corporaciones o particulares para auxiliar a los estudiantes que no dispongan de medios de fortuna (Valencia, 1905)
La medicación catodilítico-fosfatada en el tratamiento de la neurastenia Congreso de la Asociación Española para el progreso de la Ciencia (Zaragoza, 1908)
Orientación de la juventud ante el problema religioso (Valencia, 1910)
Los crímenes del caciquismo: la tragedia de El Pobo. Defensa del médico don Alfredo Alegre. Informe presentado en el jucio oral ... (Madrid, 1918)
La ignorancia de las Academias (Madrid, 1918)
Cooperación española a la formación de la Escuela Médica de Montellier Primer Congreso Internacional de la Historia de la Medicina ( Amberes, 1920)
Desarrollo de las Comunidades Espirituales (192?)
Programa para un curso de Historia Crítica de la Medicina (1921) 
La situación de México vista desde España Ateneo de Madrid (Madrid, 1921)
Sol de Levante (Gerardo Sisniega, México, 1923) 
Aventuras Tropicales. En busca del oro verde (Madrid, 1928) 
Bajo el cielo mejicano (Cía. Ibero-Americana de Publicaciones Madrid, 1930)

Bibliography
Luis Palacios Bañuelos, Elecciones en Burgos 1931-1936. El Partido Nacionalista Español, Publicaciones de la Cátedra de Historia Contemporánea de España. Universidad Complutense, Madrid, 1981. 
Julio Gil Pecharromán, Sobre España inmortal, solo Dios, José María Albiñana y el Partido Nacionalista Español (1930-1937). Universidad Nacional de Educación a Distancia, Madrid, 2002. 
Asvero Gravelli, ''Verso L'Internazionale Fascista", Roma 1.932
María Concepción Marcos del Olmo, La Segunda República en Burgos, en Historia de Burgos, Diario16 de Burgos, 1993. 
Luis Palacios Bañuelos, La Segunda República en Burgos, En Historia de Burgos, tomo IV, Caja de Burgos, Burgos, 2002. 
Arnaud Imatz, José Antonio, entre el odio y el amor. Su historia como fue. Madrid, Áltera, 2006.

References

External links 

Arbil, nº78 El ideal monárquico en la II República at arbil.org

1883 births
1936 deaths
People from Canal de Navarrés
Members of the Congress of Deputies of the Second Spanish Republic
Spanish medical writers
Spanish people of the Spanish Civil War (National faction)
People killed by the Second Spanish Republic
Executed Spanish people
19th-century Spanish people
20th-century Spanish physicians
People from Enguera
Spanish nationalists